B'Sheva is a weekly Hebrew language newspaper published in Israel.

The first issue of B'sheva, published by Arutz Sheva, appeared on July 19, 2002. It is distributed free on Thursdays in religious population centers.

Readership 
The paper is read by 130,000 families and has been rated the largest circulation newspaper in Israel's religious sector. According to a 2005 TGI survey, B'Sheva was read by 6.1% of Israeli adults. In a TGI survey comparing the last half of 2009 with the same period in 2008, B'Sheva was fourth in market share for weekly newspapers.

See also
 Israeli newspapers

References

External links
 

2002 establishments in Israel
Free newspapers
Hebrew-language newspapers
Mass media in Petah Tikva
Weekly newspapers published in Israel
Newspapers established in 2002